General elections were held in the Gambia between 22 and 31 May 1962. The result was a victory for the People's Progressive Party, which won 18 of the 32 elected seats. A further eight members were appointed by the Governor-general and protectorate chiefs.

Results

References

Gambia
Parliamentary elections in the Gambia
Legislative
Gambia Colony and Protectorate
Gambia
Election and referendum articles with incomplete results